Bonnie & Clyde: The True Story is a 1992 television film written and directed by Gary Hoffman. It stars Dana Ashbrook and Tracey Needham as Bonnie and Clyde.  The 93-minute TV film was shot on location at historic crime scenes associated with the couple in East Texas.

Premise
Bonnie Parker is estranged from her husband while still only just barely eighteen. Clyde Barrow, a handsome charmer who is in love with Bonnie, is a small-time thief, 'borrowing' cars to teach Bonnie to drive. He falls in with W.D. Jones, and their crime levels quickly rise. Soon Bonnie is dragged in with them, due to her love for Clyde, and within a short space of time, everyone is baying for the blood of Bonnie and Clyde.

Cast
 Tracey Needham as Bonnie Parker
 Dana Ashbrook as Clyde Barrow
 Doug Savant as Deputy Sheriff Ted Hinton
 Billy Morrissette as W.D. Jones
 Michael Bowen as Buck Barrow
 Libby Villari as Mrs. Pritchard

Reception
Tony Scott of Variety said that this version "concentrates on the pair's supposed innocence and sensitivity; program is surprisingly effective." When they begin traveling together, Bonnie is a teenager and Clyde is 20 years old. Scott says the chief fault of this version is "in turning the sleazy Bonnie and Clyde into a pair of sympathetic characters."

References

External links

1992 television films
1992 films
1992 drama films
1990s American films
1990s biographical drama films
1990s English-language films
American biographical drama films
American drama television films
Films about Bonnie and Clyde
Biographical television films
Fox network original films